Dendropsophus gryllatus is a species of frog in the family Hylidae.
It is endemic to Ecuador.
Its natural habitats are subtropical or tropical moist lowland forests, freshwater marshes, and plantations .
It is threatened by habitat loss.

References

Sources

gryllatus
Amphibians of Ecuador
Amphibians described in 1973
Taxonomy articles created by Polbot